The men's time trial was one of 5 track cycling events on the Cycling at the 1896 Summer Olympics programme. It was the fourth event on the cycling schedule and was held on 11 April. The first time trial competition was the only time that Olympic time trials were held over the distance of one-third of a kilometre; when the event returned to the programme at the 1928 Summer Olympics the distance was set at one kilometre.

Background

This was the first appearance of the event, which would not be held again until 1928 (after which it would be held every Games until dropped from the programme after 2004). This was the only time the event was held over a distance of one-third of a kilometre, rather than the one kilometre usually used. Paul Masson of France was the most significant cyclist in the small field, having won a "major international race" in 1894.

Competition format

The event was a time trial on the track. In 1896, the distance was one-third of a kilometre, which was one lap around the track. A flying start was used.

Schedule

The exact time of the event is not known; the cycling events began shortly after 2 p.m. and the time trial was the third event, after the 2 kilometres and 10 kilometres races.

Results

The time trial race was once around the track, or one-third of a kilometre. It was held on 11 April and eight cyclists competed. Masson won his third race of the day, with Schmal and Nikolopoulos tying for second place and having to compete in a race-off for the second position.

Race-off

In this race, Nikolopoulos improved upon his time from the first round, winning the race for an overall second-place finish. Schmal was slower in this race than he had been in the first one.

References

  (Digitally available at )
  (Excerpt available at )
 

Track cycling at the 1896 Summer Olympics
Cycling at the Summer Olympics – Men's track time trial